The Treatment is the fifth studio album by SMP, released on September 13, 2007 by Music Ration Entertainment.

Track listing

Personnel
Adapted from the liner notes of The Treatment.

SMP
 Jason Bazinet – lead vocals, drums, programming

Additional performers
 Wade Alin – guitar, mixing, additional programming, production
 Rey Guajardo – drums (4)
 Chris Roy – guitar
 Mike Welch – guitar

Production and design
 Bethany Antikajian – photography
 Garrick Antikajian – cover art, illustrations, design
 Bryce Francis – recording

Release history

References

External links 
 The Treatment at iTunes
 The Treatment at Discogs (list of releases)

2007 albums
SMP (band) albums
Albums produced by Wade Alin